Herbert Birchenough (21 September 1874 – 28 February 1942) was an English footballer who played as a goalkeeper. He played 167 league games in the Football League for Burslem Port Vale, Glossop, and Manchester United between 1898 and 1903. His son, Frank, was also a professional footballer who played in goal.

Career
Birchenough was born in Haslington, Cheshire, and played for non-league sides Haslington, Crewe Hornets, Nantwich, Sandbach St.Mary's, and Audley, before joining Burslem Port Vale in October 1897. He kept a clean sheet on his debut, on 6 November 1897 in a 4–0 home win over Ilkeston Town. He quickly established himself as the number 1 keeper and helped the team win the Staffordshire Senior Cup in 1898. Vale moved from the Midland Football League into the Football League Second Division in 1898–99, and Birchenough's goalkeeping heroics in the FA Cup win over Sheffield United were a major part of the club's success in regaining their Football League status. He was a virtual ever-present at the Athletic Ground. After 24 league and cup appearances in 1899–1900 he was sold to Glossop in January 1900 for £250 to ease Vale's financial difficulties. The "Hillmen" finished bottom of the First Division in 1900, and finished fifth and eighth in the Second Division in the 1900–01 and 1901–02 seasons respectively. He then moved on to Manchester United, and kept goal in 25 league and five FA Cup games in the 1902–03 campaign, after making his debut in a 1–0 win over Arsenal on 25 October. He later played for Crewe Alexandra in the Birmingham & District League.

Family
His son, Frank Birchenough, followed in his footsteps as a goalkeeper and represented West Ham United and Burnley.

Career statistics
Source:

Honours
Burslem Port Vale
Staffordshire Senior Cup: 1898

References

1874 births
1942 deaths
People from Haslington
Sportspeople from Cheshire
English footballers
Association football goalkeepers
English Football League players
Nantwich Town F.C. players
Port Vale F.C. players
Glossop North End A.F.C. players
Manchester United F.C. players
Crewe Alexandra F.C. players
English Football League representative players